Gazment "Gaz" Demi is an Albanian businessman who is the current president of Albanian football club Partizani.

Personal life
Demi was born in Tiranë to a Cham family from Filat. A well known businessman in Albania he contributed financially to the Kosovo Liberation Army during the Kosovo War and was awarded by the President of Kosovo, Hashim Thaci.

References

Albanian businesspeople
Living people
Date of birth missing (living people)
People from Sarandë
1963 births